Holly's World is an American reality television series starring former Girls Next Door co-star Holly Madison. The series, which follows Madison's new life and career in Las Vegas, premiered December 6, 2009 on the E! cable network with a viewership of 1.879 million and ran for two seasons.

Synopsis
Having left Los Angeles for the bright lights of The Las Vegas Strip, Holly Madison sets out to make her mark on the world. She stars as lead dancer in the Vegas show Peepshow at Planet Hollywood and hangs with a new group of friends, including Angel Porrino, her personal assistant/best friend, Josh Strickland, a former Broadway performer who plays the male lead in Peepshow, and Laura Croft, Holly's party ready roommate. In season 2, Claire Sinclair, Playmate of the Year 2011 and former Crazy Horse Paris burlesque performer, became the new addition to the group.

Development
In July 2009, Kevin Burns revealed in an interview that he was in talks to create a show featuring Madison, with E! hoping to continue the success they had with Kendra in the summer of 2009 as it had set many records for the network, including being the highest-rated premiere since 2002. Initially a one-off special, success in the ratings led to E! ordering an eight-episode season that began airing on June 13, 2010. The show is the second spin-off to The Girls Next Door, with the first being Kendra.

In January 2010, E! announced that the ratings for the special led them to order an eight-episode season that would premiere in the summer of 2010. While The Las Vegas Sun stated in mid-2011 that a third season of the show would begin filming in September, the second season of the show became its last. The cancellation came about in July when then-new E! president Bonnie Hammer vowed to "get rid of the more Playboy trashy element" from the network - a goal that was ultimately achieved as Kendra was also canceled.

Episodes

Series overview

Pilot (2009)

Season 1 (2010)

Season 2 (2011)

Ratings
The first season premiere was viewed by 1.879 million viewers beating multiple episodes of Kendra that had recently been broadcast. The following four episodes debuted to less viewers than the week previously, but remained almost consistent with the target 18-49 demographic. This downward trend was finally reversed by the sixth episode with 1.625 million viewers watching, a 4.37% increase from the previous week. Ratings continued to improve for the rest of the season, reaching an all-time high with 2.224 million viewers watching the season finale. The season averaged 1.746 million viewers.

The second season premiere was viewed by 2.006 million viewers, once again beating multiple episodes of Kendra that had recently been broadcast. The following week saw ratings at an all-time high with 2.417 million viewers. This was then followed by the third episode reaching an all-time low with a mere 1.077 million viewers. Ratings eventually stabilized for the remainder of the season. The season averaged 1.640 million viewers.

Notes

References

External links
 
 

2000s American reality television series
2010s American reality television series
2009 American television series debuts
2011 American television series endings
English-language television shows
Television shows set in Las Vegas
Television series by Alta Loma Entertainment
Television series by 20th Century Fox Television
Reality television spin-offs
E! original programming
American television spin-offs